Empis syrovatkai is a species of dance flies, in the fly family Empididae. It is included in the subgenus Empis. It is found from Fennoscandia to northern Russia and in Denmark, the Benelux, Germany, Switzerland, Austria, the Czech Republic, Slovakia and Hungary.

References

External links
Fauna Europaea

Empis
Asilomorph flies of Europe
Insects described in 1985